La traición may refer to:

 La traición (2008 TV series), a Colombian-American telenovela
 La traición (1984 TV series), a Mexican telenovela